Lemongrass is a German music project and record label created by DJ and producer Roland Voss in 1996 and known for music that mixes electronic music, EDM, downtempo, drum-n-bass, lounge, jazz, soul, trip-hop, Chillout, world music, meditation music, deep ambient, New Age and other influences.  Roland Voss and his brother Daniel formed the Lemongrass music label in 2005, they have some side projects named Jasmon, Five Seasons and Weathertunes.

Discography
Studio albums
1998: Drumatic Universe (Incoming!)
1999: Lumière Obscure (Mole Listening Pearls)
2000: Voyage au Centre de la Terre (Mole Listening Pearls)
2001: Windows (Mole Listening Pearls)
2002: Solar Incense (Receptortune)
2003: Skydiver (Mole Listening Pearls/Receptortune)
2004: Fleur Solaire (Mole Listening Pearls/Receptortune)
2005: Ikebana (Lemongrassmusic)
2007: Filmothèque (Lemongrassmusic)
2007: Rendez-vous (Receptortune)
2008: Pour L'amour (Lemongrassmusic)
2009: Hypnosis (Lemongrassmusic)
2010: The 5th Dimension (Lemongrassmusic)
2011: Sirius (Lemongrassmusic)
2012: Papillon (Lemongrassmusic)
2013: A Dream Within A Dream (Lemongrassmusic)
2014: Mémoires (Lemongrassmusic)
2015: Meditation (Lemongrassmusic)
2016: Beauty (Lemongrassmusic)
2017: Orion (Lemongrassmusic)
2018: Unite (Lemongrassmusic)
2019: Earth (Lemongrassmusic)
2019: Imagine (Lemongrassmusic)
2022: Flow (Lemongrassmusic)
2023: Dreams of Maya (Lemongrassmusic)

EPs
1999: Comme toujours (Mole Listening Pearls)
2007: Ambient Land (Lemongrassmusic)
2008: Habla mi corazón (Lemongrassmusic)
2010: Ambient Land 2 (Lemongrassmusic)
2011: Sans Souci (Lemongrassmusic)
2012: Gloriette (Lemongrassmusic)
2013: Ambient Land 3 (Lemongrassmusic)
2016: Time Machine (Lemongrassmusic)
2016: Ambient Land 4 (Lemongrassmusic)
2018: Grapes (Lemongrassmusic)
2018: Ambient Land 5 (Lemongrassmusic)
2019: Seven - feat. Jane Maximova (Lemongrassmusic)
2019: Space Odyssey (Lemongrassmusic)

References

German musical groups